A Rocket to the Moon (commonly abbreviated as ARTTM) was an American rock band formed during 2006 in Braintree, Massachusetts, United States, by Nick Santino, lead vocalist and rhythm guitarist. Guitarist and backup vocalist Justin Richards (also of Brighten), bassist and backup vocalist Eric Halvorsen, and drummer Andrew Cook eventually joined the band, forming the final member lineup. The band has two albums through Fueled by Ramen. Their debut, On Your Side, was released on October 13, 2009. Wild & Free was released on March 26, 2013.

History
Nick Santino started A Rocket to the Moon in the summer of 2006 as a musical experiment. He formerly fronted the local bands The Bad Year and The Midway Class.

Santino assembled a band of musicians in early 2008 with the help of The Maine prior to A Rocket to the Moon's first major festival appearance, at The Bamboozle. They then appeared on the July 10, 2008 episode of Total Request Live, performing the song "Dakota". Their performance brought them attention from Pete Wentz, the bassist of Fall Out Boy. Contrary to popular belief, A Rocket to the Moon were never signed to Decaydance Records (Wentz's record label and then an imprint of Fueled by Ramen, now DCD2 Records). He had shown interest in signing the band and originally wanted to do a Fueled by Ramen/Decaydance co-deal. The Decaydance side of the deal did not pan out for unknown reasons. An official announcement of the signing to Fueled by Ramen was made in August 2008. Separate tours supporting both The Cab and A Cursive Memory followed in the fall of 2008.  They also toured with Cute Is What We Aim For, Secondhand Serenade, and Automatic Loveletter. On October 14, 2008 the band released their EP Greetings From..., produced by Matt Grabe, featuring the singles "Dakota" and "If Only They Knew". The record reached No. 21 on the Billboard Top Heatseekers chart.

The band spent the first part of February and March 2009 in the studio with Matt Squire recording their debut full-length album. Sponsored by Rockstar, they were the opening band on Alternative Press magazine's AP Tour 2009 with The Maine, Hit the Lights, Family Force 5, and 3OH!3. They played the May 3 lineup of the 2009 Bamboozle festival in East Rutherford, New Jersey and played select dates on the 2009 Vans Warped Tour before touring with The Cab, Eye Alaska, The Summer Set, and My Favorite Highway on the What Happens in Vegas... Tour.  While on Warped Tour, the band did many signings with the non-profit organization Music Saves Lives, where they met with fans who gained special access to the band by donating blood. Andrew Cook, formerly of prog-rock band The Receiving End of Sirens, was made a full-time member upon release of the band's full-length album, On Your Side, released on October 12, 2009. In the fall of 2009, they supported Boys Like Girls along with VersaEmerge, The Maine, and Cobra Starship on BLGs' Love Drunk Tour presented by Op.

They played on the Take Action Tour presented by Hot Topic with Mayday Parade, There for Tomorrow, Stereo Skyline, and We the Kings in early 2010. In spring 2010, A Rocket to the Moon toured with Motion City Soundtrack, Sing It Loud, and Fun. They also opened for Hanson on select dates on Hanson's Shout It Out! Tour. They were second on the bill next to  All Time Low, Before You Exit, and City (Comma) State on All Time Low's My Small Package Tour in October 2010.

In spring 2011 A Rocket to the Moon went on their first headlining tour, the On Your Side Tour, with Anarbor, Valencia, Runner Runner, and Go Radio. In May 2011, the band toured the UK with Mayday Parade.  They also toured Australia and Indonesia with Hey Monday. In fall, A Rocket to the Moon went on the Time Travel Tour with Never Shout Never, Carter Hulsey, and Fake Problems.

From February 16–20, 2012 A Rocket to the Moon had 4 mall shows in the Philippines along with The Summer Set, Forever the Sickest Kids, The Ready Set, and A+ Dropouts called the LIV5 before going to Australia for the music festival, Soundwave.

A Rocket to the Moon released their second studio album, produced by Mark Bright, Wild & Free, on March 26, 2013.

On May 20, 2013, A Rocket to the Moon embarked on their last tour, the One Last Night Tour, which saw the band touring the world and countries like Indonesia and Singapore. They also announced that they would perform one last show at the Bazooka Rocks II Music Festival in the Philippines on August 25, 2013 before breaking up.

After the band broke up, Nick Santino pursued an alternative rock/country solo career first under the name "Nick Santino and The Northern Wind" and later under his own name, and formed a pop rock band Beach Weather in 2015. Andrew Cook and Justin Richards have gone on to play drums and guitar (respectively) for country group Dan + Shay. In 2014, Eric Halvorsen joined dance-pop band, Cobra Starship.

On January 21, 2017 the band played a one-off reunion show at 8123 Fest.

Band members

Final lineup
 Nick Santino – lead vocals, rhythm guitar (2006–2013, 2017)
 Justin Richards – lead guitar, backing vocals (2006–2013, 2017)
 Eric Halvorsen – bass guitar, backing vocals (2007–2013, 2017)
 Andrew Cook – drums (2008–2013, 2017)

Former members
 Joe Cafano – bass (2006–2007)
 Mike Cafano – drums (2006–2007)
 Loren Brinton – drums (2008)

Discography

Studio albums

Extended plays

Singles

References

External links

Alternative rock groups from Massachusetts
American pop rock music groups
Decaydance Records artists
Fueled by Ramen artists
Indie rock musical groups from Massachusetts
Musical groups established in 2006